Ed Emery may refer to:

 Ed Emery (politician) (1950–2021), member of the Missouri House of Representatives (2003–2011) and the Missouri senate (from 2013)
 Ed Emery (writer) (born 1946), ethnomusicologist, writer, translator and political activist

See also
 Edward Emery (died 1850), English numismatist and creator of forged coins